Victor Antonescu (September 3, 1871, Antonești, Teleorman County – August 22, 1947, Bucharest) was a Minister of Finance between 1935 and 1936 and Minister of Foreign Affairs of Romania from 29 August 1936 until 28 December 1937. In 1946, he was part of the Romanian delegation at the Paris Peace Conference.

1871 births
1947 deaths
People from Teleorman County
Romanian Ministers of Foreign Affairs
Romanian Ministers of Finance
Romanian Ministers of Justice
Romanian delegation to the Paris Peace Conference of 1946
Camarilla (Carol II of Romania)